KDIO (1350 AM) is a radio station broadcasting a Country music format. Licensed to Ortonville, Minnesota, United States, the station is currently owned by Prairie Winds Broadcasting.

History
On June 22, 2007, the station was sold to Big Stone Broadcasting and on October 2, 2007, the station was sold to Armada Media .

Effective August 30, 2019, Armada Media sold KDIO, four sister stations, and a translator to Prairie Winds Broadcasting, Inc. for $1.5 million.

References

External links
Official Website

Radio stations in Minnesota
Classic country radio stations in the United States
Radio stations established in 1977